Magnetohydrodynamic turbulence concerns the chaotic regimes of magnetofluid flow at high Reynolds number. Magnetohydrodynamics (MHD) deals with what is a quasi-neutral fluid with very high conductivity. The fluid approximation implies that the focus is on macro length-and-time scales which are much larger than the collision length and collision time respectively.

Incompressible MHD equations 

The incompressible MHD equations for constant mass density, are

where u, B, p represent the velocity, magnetic, and total pressure (thermal+magnetic) fields,  and  represent kinematic viscosity and magnetic diffusivity. The third equation is the incompressibility condition. In the above equation, the magnetic field is in Alfvén units (same as velocity units).

The total magnetic field can be split into two parts:  (mean + fluctuations).

The above equations in terms of Elsässer variables are

where .  Nonlinear interactions occur between the Alfvénic fluctuations .

The important nondimensional parameters for MHD are

The magnetic Prandtl number is an important property of the fluid. But plasmas have large .

The Reynolds number is the ratio of the nonlinear term  of the Navier–Stokes equation to the viscous term.  While the magnetic Reynolds number is the ratio of the nonlinear term and the diffusive term of the induction equation.

In many practical situations, the Reynolds number  of the flow is quite large.  For such flows typically the velocity and the magnetic fields are random.  Such flows are called to exhibit MHD turbulence. Note that  need not be large for MHD turbulence.  plays an important role in dynamo (magnetic field generation) problem.

The mean magnetic field plays an important role in MHD turbulence, for example it can make the turbulence anisotropic; suppress the turbulence by decreasing energy cascade etc.   The earlier MHD turbulence models assumed isotropy of turbulence, while the later models have studied anisotropic aspects.  In the following discussions will summarize these models.  More discussions on MHD turbulence can be found in Biskamp, Verma. and Galtier.

Isotropic models 

Iroshnikov and Kraichnan formulated the first phenomenological theory of MHD turbulence.  They argued that in the presence
of a strong mean magnetic field,    and  wavepackets  travel in opposite directions with
The relevant time scale is Alfven time . As a  results the energy spectra is

where  is the energy cascade rate.

Later Dobrowolny et al. derived the following generalized formulas for the cascade rates of  variables:

where  are the interaction time scales of  variables.

Iroshnikov and Kraichnan's phenomenology follows once we choose  .

Marsch  chose the nonlinear time scale  as the interaction time scale for the eddies and derived Kolmogorov-like energy spectrum for the Elsasser variables:

 
Matthaeus and Zhou attempted to combine the above two time scales by postulating the interaction time to be the harmonic
mean of Alfven time and nonlinear time.

The main difference between the two competing phenomenologies  (−3/2 and −5/3) is the chosen time scales for the interaction time.
The main underlying assumption in that Iroshnikov and Kraichnan's phenomenology should work for strong mean magnetic field,
whereas Marsh's phenomenology should work when the fluctuations dominate the mean magnetic field (strong turbulence).

However, as we will discuss below, the solar wind observations and numerical simulations tend to favour −5/3 energy spectrum
even when the mean magnetic field is stronger compared to the fluctuations. This issue was resolved by Verma using renormalization group analysis by showing that the Alfvénic fluctuations are affected by scale-dependent  "local mean magnetic field".

Renormalization group analysis have been also performed for computing the renormalized viscosity and resistivity.  It was shown that these diffusive quantities scale as  that again yields   energy spectra consistent with Kolmogorov-like model for MHD turbulence.   The above renormalization group calculation has been performed for both zero and nonzero cross helicity.

The above phenomenologies assume isotropic turbulence that is not the case in the presence of a mean magnetic field.  The mean magnetic field typically suppresses the energy cascade along the direction of the mean magnetic field.

Anisotropic models 

Mean magnetic field makes turbulence anisotropic. This aspect has been studied in last two decades.  In the limit 
,  Galtier et al. showed using kinetic equations that

The above limit is called the weak turbulence limit.

Under the strong turbulence limit, Goldereich and Sridhar argue that  ("critical balanced state") which implies that

The above anisotropic turbulence phenomenology has been extended for large cross helicity MHD.

Solar wind observations 

Solar wind plasma is in turbulent state.  Researchers have calculated the energy spectra of the solar wind plasma from the data
collected from the spacecraft.
turbulence.  The interplanetary and interstellar electron density fluctuations also provide
a window for investigating MHD turbulence.

Numerical simulations 

The theoretical models discussed above are tested using the high resolution direct numerical simulation (DNS).  Number of recent simulations report the spectral indices to be closer to 5/3.  There are others that report the spectral indices near 3/2.  The regime of power law is typically less than a decade.  Since 5/3 and 3/2 are quite close numerically, it is quite difficult to ascertain the validity of MHD turbulence models from the energy spectra.

Energy fluxes  can be more reliable quantities to validate MHD turbulence models.
When 
(high cross helicity fluid or imbalanced MHD) the energy flux predictions of Kraichnan and Iroshnikov model is very different from that of Kolmogorov-like model.  It has been shown using DNS that the fluxes   computed from the numerical simulations are in better agreement with Kolmogorov-like model compared to Kraichnan and Iroshnikov model.

Anisotropic aspects of MHD turbulence have also been studied using numerical simulations.  The predictions of Goldreich and Sridhar  have been verified in many simulations.

Energy transfer 

Energy transfer among various scales between the velocity and magnetic field is an important problem in MHD turbulence.   These quantities
have been computed both theoretically and numerically.  These calculations show a significant energy transfer from the
large scale velocity field to the large scale magnetic field.  Also, the cascade of magnetic energy is typically forward.  These results have critical
bearing on dynamo problem.

There are many open challenges in this field that hopefully will be resolved in near future with the help of numerical simulations, theoretical modelling, experiments, and observations (e.g., solar wind).

See also 
 Magnetohydrodynamics
 Turbulence
 Alfvén wave
 Solar dynamo
 Reynolds number
 Navier–Stokes equations
 Computational magnetohydrodynamics
 Computational fluid dynamics
 Solar wind
 Magnetic flow meter
 Ionic liquid
 List of plasma (physics) articles

References

Magnetohydrodynamics
Turbulence